Guyanese Sign Language is the deaf sign language of Guyana. Little information is available.  Since American Sign Language is used for education in Guyana, "Guyanese Sign Language" may simply be the local name for ASL.

References

Sign languages
Languages of Guyana